This is a list of Philippine Basketball Association players by total career assists.

Statistics accurate as of January 16, 2023.

See also
List of Philippine Basketball Association players

References

External links
Philippine Basketball Association All-time Most Assists Leaders – PBA Online.net
Link Label

Assists, Career